Clayton Kelly Gross (November 30, 1920-January 10, 2016) from Walla Walla, Washington was a Army Air Forces World War II Ace who shot down 6 enemy planes over Europe. Gross also flew planes in the D-Day invasion of Normany, France both on June 5 and 6, 1944. He was a recipient of the American Fighter Aces Congressional Gold Medal, the Distinguished Flying Cross and the Silver Star. He flew in 105 combat missions during WWII.

Education
Lewis & Clark High School (1938)
Gonzaga Prep (1938-1941)
Aviation Cadet January (1941-1942)
University of Southern California and Loyola University, B. S. 1954
University of Oregon, D.M.D. 1958

Career

In 1941, Clayton Kelly Gross was a 20-year-old aviation cadet with the Army Air Forces. He received his commission and the rank of second lieutenant in September 1942.

In 1943 Gross was assigned to the 354th Fighter Group and began flying P-51 Mustangs. from Britain.  He became an ace with six confirmed aerial kills, including a jet-powered Me 262.

D-Day

On the night of June 5, 1944: the night before the D-Day Invasion of France, Gross participated in a secret mission escorting gliders behind enemy lines at Normandy, France. On June 6, 1944, the date of D-Day, Gross flew a P-51 Mustang he named “Live Bait,”. His superior told him to fly low and attract enemy fire. Gross joked that he would be live bait.

In 1944 Gross was on a bombing mission over Berlin when he engaged Bf 109. An allied P-47 Accidentally shot Gross's P-51 and the 50 caliber bullet pushed the back of the cockpit into Gross's head. He flew 105 combat missions he flew.

In 2006 he wrote and published his memoirs entitled: Live Bait: WWII Memoirs of an "Undefeated Fighter Ace".

In 2014 Gross was one of a handful of Aces who attended a White House ceremony with President Barack Obama to sign the H.R. 685, the American Fighter Aces
Congressional Gold Medal Act, into law.

Affiliations
President of the American Fighter Aces Association (2015)

Awards

Congressional Gold Medal (2015)
Silver Star
Distinguished Flying Cross
Air Medal
Distinguished Units Citation

Personal
Gross was born in Walla Walla, Washington, on Jan. 20, 1920, and he attended high school and was raised in Spokane, Washington. His first wife was named Gwendolyn Yeo, and together they had two children--a son, Mike; and a daughter, Mary. After Gwen's death, Gross married Ramona Bettendorf. Gross was a career dentist in Vancouver, Washington. He retired in 1998. He died in Sparks, Nevada, on Jan. 10, 2016.

See also
List of World War II aces from the United States
List of World War II flying aces

References

Bibliography

Further reading

Notes

External links
Clayton Kelly Gross
Clayton Kelly Gross, P-51 Mustang Ace

1920 births
2016 deaths
American World War II flying aces
Military personnel from California
United States Navy personnel of World War II
Recipients of the Distinguished Flying Cross (United States)
Recipients of the Silver Star